Dion Neutra (October 8, 1926 – November 24, 2019) was a modernist / International style American architect and consultant who worked originally with his father, Richard Neutra (1892–1970).

Life
Neutra started training with his father at age 11.  He attended the University of Southern California, spending his junior year abroad studying at the Swiss Federal Institute of Technology architecture program in Zurich, and graduated cum laude.

Neutra became president of the Neutra company upon Richard Neutra's death in 1970. He worked with current owners of Neutra properties to update them sympathetically with original design intentions.

Neutra hosted the 85th anniversary party for Neutra Architecture 1926-2011 from April 8–10, 2011 at the Eagle Rock Recreation Center and the Neutra VDL Studio and Residences.

Neutra died on November 24, 2019, at his home on Neutra Place ("Reunion House") in the Silver Lake neighborhood of Los Angeles at the age of 93.

Preservation efforts
As of July 16, 2011, he began writing a blog dedicated to the preservation of the Kronish House in Beverly Hills, California, while under threat of demolition. Other projects Dion has championed include the Cyclorama Building at Gettysburg on the Gettysburg battlefield, Pennsylvania, and the Mariners Medical Arts Building in Newport Beach, California. He was also concerned about the future of the Los Angeles County Hall of Records since the Records Department has been relocated to Norwalk, California.

Selected works
Dion Neutra Reunion House, 1950, Silver Lake, Los Angeles
Kester Avenue Elementary School, 5353 Kester Avenue, Los Angeles (with Richard Neutra), 1951, Sherman Oaks, California
Kronish House, 1955, Beverly Hills, California
VDL II Research House, 1966, Silver Lake, Los Angeles
Treehouse Apartment, 1968, Silver Lake, Los Angeles
Scheimer House, 1972, Tarzana, Los Angeles
Huntington Beach Public Library, 1975, Huntington Beach, California
Canfield Elementary School, 1976, West Los Angeles, California
Treetops Apartments, 1980, Silver Lake, Los Angeles
Claremont Graduate Management Building, 1982, Claremont, California

References 

1926 births
2019 deaths
20th-century American architects
American people of Austrian-Jewish descent
Jewish architects
USC School of Architecture alumni
21st-century American architects